Stephen Kaufman or variant spellings may refer to:

Stephen B. Kaufman, American politician
S. K. Thoth (born 1956), born Stephen Kaufman, American performance artist
Steve Kaufman (1960–2010), American artist
Steve A. Kauffman, American professional sports agent
Steven Kaufman (born 1977), American entrepreneur and philanthropist
Steve Kaufmann (born 1945), Swedish-born Canadian hyperpolyglot